Cynaeda forsteri is a moth in the family Crambidae. It was described by Gustave de Lattin in 1951. It is found in Russia, where it has been recorded from the southern Ural.

References

Moths described in 1951
Odontiini